Men's ice hockey tournaments have been staged at the Olympic Games since 1920. The men's tournament was introduced as a demonstration sport at the 1920 Summer Olympics, and made a permanent sport when the Winter Olympics began in 1924. The Soviet Union participated in nine tournaments, the first in 1956 and the last in 1988. A total of 11 goaltenders and 95 skaters represented the Soviet Union at the Olympics.

The Olympic Games were originally intended for amateur athletes, so the players of the National Hockey League (NHL) and other professional leagues were not allowed to compete. The countries that benefited most were the Soviet Bloc countries of Eastern Europe, where top athletes were state-sponsored while retaining their status as amateurs. In protest at this policy, Canada withdrew from the 1972 and 1976 Olympics. In 1986, the International Olympic Committee (IOC) voted to allow all athletes to compete in Olympic Games, starting in 1988.

Throughout its existence, the Soviet Union was one of the most dominant teams at the Olympics: it won a medal in each of the nine tournaments it participated in, winning seven gold medals, one silver, and one bronze. When the Soviet Union dissolved, it was replaced in subsequent tournaments by the Unified Team (1992) and Russia (since 1994). Six players would play for both the Soviet Union and either the Unified Team or Russia at the Olympics.

Goaltender Vladislav Tretiak played in four tournaments, the most among all Soviet players. Three players – Viacheslav Fetisov, Vladimir Krutov, and Sergei Makarov – played in the most games, with 22 each across three Olympics. Anatoli Firsov scored the most goals (18), while Valeri Kharlamov had the most assists (22) and the most total points (36). Six players have been inducted into the Hockey Hall of Fame, while 28 have been inducted into the International Ice Hockey Hall of Fame.



Key

Goaltenders

Skaters

References

Notes

Citations

References

 
 
 
 
 
 
 
 

ice hockey
Soviet Union
Soviet Union

Soviet Union national ice hockey team